Shem Obado Ngoche (born 6 June 1989) is a Kenyan cricketer. He is the brother of three other Kenyan international cricketers, Lameck Onyango, James Ngoche and Nehemiah Odhiambo.

International career
Ngoche was one of three brothers, others being James and Nehemiah, in the Kenyan squad for the World Cup held in Bangladesh, India and Sri Lanka from 19 February to 2 April 2011.

He is infamous for his consistency. During the tournament he batted in 3 innings, was dismissed 3 times and only faced 3 balls. He didn't hit any of them.

In January 2018, he was named in Kenya's squad for the 2018 ICC World Cricket League Division Two tournament. In September 2018, he was named in Kenya's squad for the 2018 Africa T20 Cup. The following month, he was named in Kenya's squad for the 2018 ICC World Cricket League Division Three tournament in Oman. Initially, Collins Obuya was named captain, was ruled out of Kenya's squad due to personal commitments with Ngoche was named captain in his place. He was the leading wicket-taker for Kenya in the tournament, with six dismissals in five matches.

In May 2019, he was named as the captain of Kenya's squad for the Regional Finals of the 2018–19 ICC T20 World Cup Africa Qualifier tournament in Uganda. In September 2019, he was named as the captain of Kenya's squad for the 2019 ICC T20 World Cup Qualifier tournament in the United Arab Emirates. In November 2019, he was named in Kenya's squad for the Cricket World Cup Challenge League B tournament in Oman, but not as the team's captain.

In October 2021, he was named as the captain of Kenya's squad for the Regional Final of the 2021 ICC Men's T20 World Cup Africa Qualifier tournament in Rwanda.

References

1989 births
Living people
Kenyan cricketers
Kenya One Day International cricketers
Kenya Twenty20 International cricketers
Cricketers at the 2011 Cricket World Cup